London Buses route 42 is a Transport for London contracted bus route in London, England. Running between East Dulwich Sainsbury's and Liverpool Street bus station, it is operated by London Central.

History
Route 42 commenced operation on 25 July 1912 as a daily route between Finsbury Park station and Clapton Pond via Seven Sisters Road, Amhurst Park and Upper Clapton Road. On 26 August 1912, it was extended from Clapton to Tower of London via Hackney, Whitechapel Road, Aldgate and Minories. From 14 April 1913 it was extended on Mondays to Saturdays from Tower of London to Camberwell Green via Tower Bridge, Old Kent Road and Albany Road.

The route was reduced from a daily allocation of eight vehicles at the beginning of 1970 to only three by 1985, when the evening service was also withdrawn. Upon being tendered, in 1987 the route passed to London Country South East.

Route 42 was included in the sale of Limebourne Buses to Connex in July 2001. Upon being re-tendered, it passed to London Easylink on 20 April 2002. However, on 21 August 2002, London Easylink went into liquidation.

Route 42 was taken over by Transport for London subsidiary East Thames Buses. On 3 October 2009, East Thames Buses was sold to London General, which included a five-year contract to operate route 42.

On 1 October 2016, the route was extended from Denmark Hill Sunray Avenue to East Dulwich Sainsburys via Dulwich Hospital with double-decker buses introduced. On the same date, the route was temporarily withdrawn between Tower Bridge Road and Liverpool Street bus station until 23 December 2016 while Tower Bridge was closed for refurbishment.

In 2021, the frequency of the service was reduced from 4.8 buses per hour to 4 during Monday-Friday peak times, and from 5 buses per hour to 4 during Monday-Saturday daytimes.

Current route
Route 42 operates via these primary locations:
East Dulwich Sainsburys
East Dulwich station 
North Dulwich station 
Denmark Hill
Denmark Hill station   
King's College Hospital
Camberwell Green
Bricklayers Arms
City Hall
Tower Bridge Road
Tower Bridge
Tower of London
Tower Gateway station 
Aldgate station 
Liverpool Street bus station  for Liverpool Street station

References

External links

Timetable

Bus routes in London
Transport in the London Borough of Southwark
Transport in the City of London
Transport in the London Borough of Tower Hamlets
Transport in the London Borough of Hackney